Comyn is a surname.  The name originated in the 12th century from Clan Cumming and was commonly used by the Lords of Badenoch, the Lords of Kilbride and the Earls of Buchan.

List of persons with the surname
 Alexander Comyn (disambiguation)
Alexander Comyn, Earl of Buchan (died 1289)
Alexander Comyn (died 1308), Sheriff of Aberdeen
Alexander Comyn of Dunphail (died 1330)
 Alice Comyn, Countess of Buchan (1289–1349)
 Alison Comyn (born 1969), Irish television journalist and broadcaster
 Andy Comyn (born 1968), English footballer
 Dan Comyn (1872–1949), Irish cricketer
 David Comyn (1854–1907), Irish language revivalist 
 David Comyn, Lord of Kilbride (died 1247)
 Edmund Comyn (died 1314), Scottish noble
 Elizabeth de Comyn (1299–1372), English noblewoman
 Hugh Comyn (1876–1937), English civil servant and sportsman
 James Comyn (1921–1997), English High Court judge
 Jardine Comyn, Lord of Inverallochy
 John Comyn (disambiguation)
John Comyn (bishop) (c. 1150–1212), Archbishop of Dublin
John Comyn (died 1242), Earl of Angus
John Comyn I of Badenoch (c. 1215–1275)
John Comyn II of Badenoch (died 1302)
John Comyn III of Badenoch (c. 1274–1306)
John Comyn IV of Badenoch (c. 1294–1314)
John Comyn, Earl of Buchan (c. 1260–1308)
John Comyn of Ulceby (died c. 1332)
 Matt Comyn (born 1975/1976), Australian CEO
 Michael Comyn (1871–1952), Irish barrister
 Richard Comyn (d. c 1179), justiciar of Lothian
 Robert Comyn (disambiguation)
Robert Buckley Comyn (1792-1853), British judge
Robert Comyn (died 1306), Scottish nobleman
Robert Comyn (priest) (1672-1727), English priest
 Stephen George Comyn (1764–1839), English naval chaplain
 Valens Comyn (1688 –1751), English MP 
 Walter Comyn, Lord of Badenoch (died 1258)
 William Comyn (disambiguation)
William Comyn, Lord of Badenoch (1163–1233)
William Comyn, Lord of Kilbride (died 1283)
William Leslie Comyn (1877–?), Californian businessman and shipbuilder

 Scottish surnames